Moments musicaux (French, 'musical moments') may refer to:

 Six moments musicaux (Schubert), 1823–1828
 Six moments musicaux (Rachmaninoff), 1896

See also
 Classical music
 Suite (music)
 The Musical Moment, a musical composition by Nicolae Kirculescu